The Malabar Transmitter Annex is currently used as an auxiliary communications annex in support of space activities for NASA and the U.S. Space Force. The facility is under the control of the 45th Space Wing; security is administered by Patrick Space Force Base. Originally established as the Malabar Naval Outer Landing Field as a naval airfield in 1943 within Brevard County, Florida to augment what was then Naval Air Station Melbourne. The airfield, which had four runways, was decommissioned as an active airfield in the mid-1950s.

History
The airfield was built during World War II as Malabar Naval Outer Landing Field, one of two satellite airfields for NAS Melbourne, which conducted advanced flight training in North American T-6 Texans, Grumman F4F Wildcats and Grumman F6F Hellcats.

The Malabar airfield was constructed early in 1943. It was not depicted on the January 1943 Miami Sectional Chart. Early depictions of the field include USDA aerial photos from February 24, 1943, which show four unfinished airfield runways. On April 22, 1943, Malabar had four asphalt runways.  The earliest chart depiction which has been located of the Malabar airfield was on the July 1943 Orlando Sectional Chart. It depicted "Malabar (Navy)" as an auxiliary airfield. It was an active military airfield, labeled "Malabar (Navy)", on the 1949 Orlando Sectional Chart, and described as having a  hard-surface runway.

The airfield was closed in 1954. It was listed as an active airfield on the August 1954 Orlando Sectional Chart, but the Aerodromes table on the chart listed its status as "Closed, leased for grazing".

The Malabar Test Facility was opened in the early 1960s to study lasers and laser effects. Subsequently, it was transferred to the Space and Missile Systems Organization in 1978, Air Force Space Technology Center in 1984, and Phillips Laboratory in 1990.

The former Malabar airfield property was erroneously labeled "Lynbrook Park" on a 2007 street map.

Operations
There are almost a dozen antenna towers around the facility, as well as log periodics. The primary function is to act as a remote transmitter site to support operations for the Kennedy Space Center and Cape Canaveral Space Force Station.

The facility is under military security. An annual firearms drill is held for security personnel.

The facility is under the control of the 45th Space Wing and security is administered from Patrick Space Force Base.

As of June 1, 2010 all the large antennas have been removed. Only one tower remains for microwave communications.

References

Airports in Brevard County, Florida
Defunct airports in Florida
Airports established in 1943
1943 establishments in Florida